Tylomelania helmuti is a species of freshwater snail with an operculum, an aquatic gastropod mollusk in the family Pachychilidae.

The specific name helmuti is in honor of Helmut Glaubrecht, father of the second author and supporter of the malacological research.

Distribution 
This species occurs in the Lake Towuti drainage, in Sulawesi, Indonesia. The type locality is the stream-crossing on the road from Wawondula to Timampu.

Description 
The shell has always some whorls corroded with 3-8 whorls.

The width of the shell is up to 8.0–16.3 mm. The height of the shell is up to 15.8–34.6 mm. The width of the aperture is 4.0–8.5 mm. The height of the aperture is 6.2–13.2 mm.

Ecology 
This species lives in shallow streams and marshes.

References

helmuti
Gastropods described in 2003